Aquaticola is a genus of fungi in the Cephalothecaceae family of the Ascomycota. The relationship of this taxon to other taxa within the Sordariomycetes class is unknown (incertae sedis), except that it is in subclass Diaporthomycetidae, and it has not yet been placed with certainty into any order.

Species
As accepted by Species Fungorum;
 Aquaticola hyalomura 
 Aquaticola longicolla 
 Aquaticola minutiguttulata 
 Aquaticola triseptata 

Former species;
 A. ellipsoidea  = Atractospora ellipsoidea, Atractosporaceae family

References

Sordariomycetes genera
Annulatascaceae